Amar Kantak is a Bengali drama film directed by Sukhen Das and produced by Mala Gupta. It was released in 1986 in the banner of Parna Chitram. This movie received BFJA award in 1987.

Plot
Writer Debesh goes from place to place searching for his younger brother Binu. Binu is missing for a long time. Debesh goes to an Ashram in Amarkantak and meets a lady monk named Bahinji. He realises that Bahinji is hiding something. But latter she narrates her story which reveals the missing history of Binu.

Cast
 Chiranjeet as Binu
 Moon Moon Sen as Urmi/Bahinji
 Dipankar De as Urmi's Father
 Sumitra Mukherjee as Urmi's Mother
 Sukhen Das as Debesh
 Shakuntala Barua
 Soma Mukhopadhyay

References

External links
 

1986 films
1986 drama films
Bengali-language Indian films
Indian drama films
1980s Bengali-language films
Films directed by Sukhen Das
Films based on works by Ashutosh Mukhopadhyay